Benjimen Daniel Schwimmer (born January 18, 1984) is an American professional dancer, choreographer, actor and director. He was the winner of the second season of So You Think You Can Dance (2006) and has choreographed for both the U.S. and the international versions of the show. He is the only dancer in the world to hold World titles in solo, partner and group divisions at the same time. Schwimmer  works on TV, film and stage both in front and behind camera.  He was the specialties choreographer for Quentin Tarantino's "Once Upon a Time In Hollywood".

Early life
Schwimmer was born on January 18, 1984, in Newport Beach, California, and grew up in a  Latter-day Saint (Mormon) household in Moreno Valley, California. He is the son of choreographer and West Coast Swing dancer Buddy Schwimmer. His mother, Laurie Schwimmer, and sister, Lacey Schwimmer, are also renowned partner and solo dancers.

He began acting at 2, landing nationwide commercials for McDonalds, Pizza Hut, Power Wheels and guest stint on Full House.

He started competing at five years old. He finished his studies early, and then taught dance  at 17 years for one semester at Crafton Hills College in Yucaipa.

Schwimmer and his cousin, Heidi Groskreutz, (Top 4 finalist on the same season of So You Think You Can Dance), are also U.S. Open and World Showcase Swing champions. Schwimmer put dancing on hold to serve a two-year mission for the Church of Jesus Christ of Latter-day Saints (LDS Church) in the Mexican state of Oaxaca. He returned afterwards to the dance circuit.  He founded D.E.M.A.N.D., a non-profit organization that helps the less fortunate and provides health care for dancers with HIV/AIDS and other illnesses, and was a co-owner of 5678 Dance Studio in Redlands since 2011.

Career

After his two year mission and stint on So You Think You Can Dance tours, Schwimmer reclaimed his titles as both US and World Swing Champion with a new partner, Kellese Key in 2008. He has never lost a routine competition.

Schwimmer also appeared in the independent film, Love N' Dancing, starring Amy Smart. He was the cover story in a 10-page spread in "Dancer Magazine", January 9 issue, which featured his own photography. Schwimmer also costarred in the comedy "Leading Ladies".

Paula Abdul hired Schwimmer as her creative director and choreographer for her final performance on American Idol and for her opening show for VH1's Divas:Live '09. He also danced alongside her in both performances.

Working with his father, he choreographed  the short program of American figure skater Jeremy Abbott, which was first performed at the 2011 Cup of China. Benji has since choreographed for 2 different Winter Olympics, including Adam Rippon's "O" .

In 2018, Schwimmer announced his retirement from competing at The Open Swing Dance Champions, being the only dancer to win 14 World Titles with 4 different partners, never taking a loss.

Schwimmer is currently developing TV and film projects for 2022.

Personal life

Schwimmer is gay. He came out publicly in 2012, after being put through reparative therapy, struggling with his sexuality for a number of years. The catalyst for his decision was the death by suicide of two gay friends. He has since left the LDS Church and publicly criticized their policies against members of the LGBT community.

Awards

 1991 US Open, Young America Div. (ages 6–11), 1st Place, partner Heidi Groskreutz
 1992 "Future Stars" Champion, Sabado Gigante (TV), partner Heidi Groskreutz
 1993 "Future Stars" Champion, Sabado Gigante (TV), partner Heidi Groskreutz
 1994 World Swing Dance Championships Youth Division, 1st Place partner Heidi Groskreutz
 1995 World Swing Dance Championships Youth Division, 1st Place partner Heidi Groskreutz
 1995 US Open Swing Dance Championships, Adult Team Division, 1st Place Jump Start
 1995 Feather Award "Outstanding Dancer(youth)"
 1995 World Swing Dance Championships, Adult Team Division, 1st place, Jump Start
 1996 World Swing Dance Championships, Youth Division, 1st Place partner Heidi Groskreutz
 1996 World Swing Dance Championships, Adult Team Division, 1st Place, Jump Start
 1997 Skippy Blair "Footsteps Award"
 1998 Sabado Gigante's "Best Dance Couple" (multiple winner), partner Heidi Groskreutz
 1999 World Swing Dance Championships, Youth Division, 1st Place partner Heidi Groskreutz
 1999 World Swing Dance Championships, Team Division, 1st Place, Jump Start
 2001 World Swing Dance Championships, Youth Division, 1st Place partner Heidi Groskreutz
 2001 US Open Swing Dance Championship, Showcase Division, 1st Place, partner Heidi Groskreutz 
 2002 USA Sing Net "Person of the Year" 
 2002 US Open Swing Dance Championship, Showcase Division, 1st Place, partner Heidi Groskreutz
 2005 US Open Swing Dance Championship, Showcase Division, 1st Place, partner Heidi Groskreutz 
 2005 US Open Swing Dance Championships, Team Division, 1st Place  Jump Start 2
 2006 SO YOU THINK YOU CAN DANCE, 1st Place, "America's Favorite Dancer", after a tally of 16 million votes for the Finale
 2007 - 1st Place: World Swing Dance Championships, Classic Division; Partner: Lacey Schwimmer
 2008 LAPD Jack and Jill (improv) Championships, 1st Place, partner Deborah Szekely
 2008 USA Grand Nationals Showcase Division, 1st Place, partner Kellese Key
 2008 USA Grand Nationals Cabaret Division, 1st Place
 2008 Dallas D.A.N.C.E. Cabaret Division, 1st Place
 2008 US Open Swing Dance Championship, Showcase Division, 1st Place, partner Kellese Key
 2009 US Open Swing Dance Championship, Showcase Division, 1st Place, partner Kellese Key
 2010 US Open Swing Dance Championship, Showcase Division, 1st Place, partner Torri Smith
 2011 US Open Swing Dance Championship, Showcase Division, 1st Place, partner Torri Smith
 2012 US Open Swing Dance Championship, Showcase Division, 1st Place, partner Torri Smith
 2013 US Open Swing Dance Championship, Showcase Division, 1st Place, partner Torri Smith
 2014 US Open Swing Dance Championship, Showcase Division, 1st Place, partner Torri Smith
 2015 US Open Swing Dance Championship, Showcase Division, 1st Place, partner Nicole Clonch
2016 US Open Swing Dance Championship, Showcase Division, 1st Place, partner Nicole Clonch
2017 US Open Swing Dance Championship, Showcase Division, 1st Place, partner Nicole Clonch
2018 US Open Swing Dance Championship, Showcase Division, 1st Place, partner Nicole Clonch

See also
 List of dancers

References

External links

 Benji Schwimmer web site (Benji Schwimmer official web site)
 5678 Dance Studios (Schwimmer family studio)
 The Benji & Heidi Zone (USA Swing Dance Network)
Benji and Heidi DVDs - official website with instructional WCS videos taught by Benji Schwimmer and Heidi Groskreutz.
 Benji Schwimmer photos and video clips Benji Schwimmer photos and video clips from SYTYCD TOUR
Benji Schwimmer Biographical information and an interview with Benji by USA Swing Net.
US Open awards
 Video interview and dance clips on Access Hollywood
 "Benji Shows Why He's Your 'Favorite Dancer'", TV Guide "Insider", August 21, 2006

1984 births
American choreographers
American male dancers
American Latter Day Saints
American Mormon missionaries in Mexico
American gay actors
Living people
Male actors from Newport Beach, California
So You Think You Can Dance winners
So You Think You Can Dance choreographers
LGBT Latter Day Saints
LGBT dancers
LGBT people from California
So You Think You Can Dance (American TV series) contestants
21st-century American dancers
Crafton Hills College people
21st-century LGBT people